Atilla Koca (born 16 July 1980) is a Turkish professional footballer who currently plays as a goalkeeper for Darica Genclerbirligi.

References

1980 births
Living people
Turkish footballers
Association football goalkeepers
Süper Lig players
Eskişehirspor footballers
Sivasspor footballers